Stoney Pond is a man-made lake located by Bucks Corners, New York. Fish species present in the lake include pumpkinseed sunfish, and largemouth bass. There is access by carry down off Stoney Pond Road.

References

Lakes of New York (state)
Lakes of Madison County, New York